In attempts to retain or re-assert control over its colonies in America, the Spanish Empire deployed several expeditionary forces during and after the Spanish American wars of independence. The largest of these forces, known as "the expeditionary army of Costa Firme", and consisting of over 10,000 troops under General Morillo, undertook the Spanish reconquest of New Granada (1815–16). Forces were also sent to New Spain between 1812 and 1817. Later, after Mexican independence in 1821, a Spanish garrison was sent from Cuba to occupy Spain's last Mexican outpost, the fortress of San Juan de Ulúa; this force remained there until surrendering in 1825. Finally, a force under Isidro Barradas Valdés attempted to regain control of Mexico in 1829.

Viceroyalty of New Spain

Counter insurgency (1812-1821)

Defense of San Juan de Ulúa (1821-1825)

Expedition of Isidro Barradas (1829)

Expeditionary Army of Costa Firme
(Venezuela and New Granada)

Viceroyalty of Perú
(Perú, Chile and Upper Peru)

References

Spanish American wars of independence orders of battle